Micropterix hartigi is a species of moth belonging to the family Micropterigidae. It was described by Heath in 1981 and is endemic to Italy.

Etymology
It is named for Italian lepidopterist Friedrich Reichsgraf von Hartig.

References

External links
Images

Micropterigidae
Endemic fauna of Italy
Moths described in 1981
Moths of Europe
Taxa named by John Heath